The Type 032 submarine (NATO reporting name: Qing-class) is a class of diesel-electric submarine currently undergoing testing in China's People's Liberation Army Navy. It is said to be the world's largest conventional submarine, at a submerged displacement of 6,628 tonnes and is able to submerge for a maximum of 30 days.

Design
The Type 032 has a similar ventral "bay" to the Golf-class submarine that protrudes downward. The project for this double hulled submarine begun in January 2005, and construction begun at Wuhan Shipyard in 2008. The submarine was launched on September 10, 2010, and sea trials were completed in September 2012. The submarine entered service on October 12, 2012 with pennant number 201.

The submarine is a testbed for new technologies such as combustion powered torpedoes, compartments for special forces, underwater unmanned vehicles, new SLBMs, new cruise missiles, new anti ship missiles, new SAMs, and a new escape pod which are applied to the Type 095 and Type 096 submarines.

Specifications are as follows:
Length (m): 92.6
Beam (m): 10
Height (m): 17.2
Draft (m): 6.85
Surfaced displacement (t): 3797
Submerged displacement (t): 6628
Operating depth (m): 160
Max depth (m): 200
Surface speed (kt): 10
Submerged speed (kt): 14
Complement: 88 crew and around 100 scientists and researchers
Endurance (day): 30 for 88 complement, 5 for 130 complement, and 3 for 200 complement
Torpedo: two torpedo tubes (TT) in the bow, with one 650 mm TT on starboard side and one 533 mm TT on port side
Missile: two vertical launching system (VLS) tubes for submarine launched ballistic missiles in the conning tower, four VLS tubes for cruise/ASW/AShM missiles in the forward section.
Design: double-hull

See also
Type 031 submarine

References

External links
Type 032 submarine (globalsecurity.org)

Submarine classes
Submarines of the People's Liberation Army Navy
Ballistic missile submarines
Experimental submarines